Peepoodo & the Super Fuck Friends is a French adult animated series created by Balak and co-written by Brice Chevillard, Nicolas Athané and Balak. The series consists of comedic sexual education cartoon shorts for those over the age of 18.

The series premiered on July 16, 2018 on the Blackpills website. After a campaign of crowdfunding on Kickstarter, a second season began production. Peepoodo is the second series produced by the animation studio Bobbypills.

Premise 
Peepoodo & the Super Fuck Friends explores "sexuality without taboos and in all its forms, including dicks and nipples." It also focuses on an unrestrained sexuality that ignores prejudices and intolerance.

At the end of the first season, Peepoodo destroys the earth, and in the second season he, accompanied by Dr. Pussycat, Evelyne and Tuffalo will board a spaceship, looking for a planet to settle on, finding hostility in space. It will be a science fiction adventure which can be described as "Star Trek with sex, full of plot twists and strong messages, dealing with the issues of today" and a variation of The Hitchhikers Guide to the Galaxy and Doctor Who with sexual themes.

Characters 
 Peepoodo (voiced by Brigitte Lecordier in French and Barbara Weber-Scaff in English), a  anthropomorphic pink hamster, who wears only a chunky, yellow sweater.
 Dr. Monique Pussycat (voiced by Jeanne Chartier in French and Barbara Weber-Scaff in English), an anthropomorphic yellow tabby cat with  pink hair and large breasts who works as a doctor in her own clinic. Up until Kevin transitions into Evelyn she is the only primary character who is fully clothed - usually in a lab coat, in keeping with her role as physician. She also wears blue gloves, red panties and red high-heeled shoes. She supplies educational information in most episodes (and as such is arguably the most competent and sensible of the friends). Her name in French is Docteur Lachatte.
 Tuffalo (voiced by Brice Chevillard in French and Douglas Rand in English), a Water buffalo with a muscular-like physique and a micropenis, who wears a pink tank top. His voice is similar to that of the Muppet character Animal. His name in French is Grocosto.
 Kevin/Evelyn (voiced by Balak in French and David Gasman in English), a friendly trans polar bear who identifies as male until the episode "Dr. Peepoodo", in which Dr. Pussycat counsels her about being trans off-screen, after which Evelyn reveals her true self. She favours a green sleeveless top worn over a black bra and cropped jeans.
 Lilifan (voiced by Léa Tcherniatinsky in French and Christine Ryndak in English), a shy and nervous blue elephant clad in a pink sleeveless shirt. She is presumed dead at the Season 1 finale, but is later revealed to be alive during Season 2 Episode 7.
 Beatrix Dominatrix (voiced by Léa Justum in French and Sharon Mann in English), the main antagonist at the end of each season, who seeks the "alpha male" Peepoodo. She is a large, anthropomorphic wolf with the physique of a female bodybuilder, who wears shiny, black thigh-high boots and a black bra.

Production
Balak, otherwise known as Yves Bigerel, talked about adult animation, with their projects not allowed on French television, stated that he was given the green light to begin the show by Blackpills.

For the English dub for the show, Jacqui Chappell and Nina Nevers work on script adaption, Simón Hanukai is the voice and scripting director, Anais Khout mixes content, and "comedians" Barbara Weber-Scaff, Sharon Mann, Christine Ryndak, Douglas Rand, David Gasman, Yves Bigerel, Brice Chevillard voice characters.

Episodes

Series overview

Shorts (2017–2019)

Season 1 (2018)

Peepoodo & the Super Space Friends, Season 2 (2021)

See also 
 History of French animation
 History of animation

References

External links

French adult animated comedy television series
Adult animated web series
Adult comedy web series
2010s French animated television series
2020s French animated television series
LGBT characters in animated television series
LGBT-related animated web series
Transgender-related television shows
LGBT-related animated series
Anime-influenced Western animated television series
Parody television series
French web series